Conasprella torensis is a species of sea snail, a marine gastropod mollusk in the family Conidae, the cone snails and their allies.

Description
The length of the shell attains 31 mm.

Distribution
This species occurs in the Red Sea.

References

 Sturany, R. "Gastropoden des Rothen Meeres. Expeditionen SM Schiff" Pola" iiKias Rothe Meer 1895/96 und 1897/98." ZooL Ergeb. Wien (1903): 1-75

External links
 To World Register of Marine Species

torensis
Gastropods described in 1903